Toccata (film)  is a 1969 Dutch film directed by Herman van der Horst.

Cast
 Feike Asma
 Dolph de Lange

External links 
 

1969 films
Dutch black-and-white films
1960s Dutch-language films